Bernd Hobsch (born 7 May 1968) is a German former professional footballer who played as a striker.

Club career 
Hobsch appeared in more than 230 East German and German top-flight matches. He won the 1992–93 Bundesliga with Werder Bremen. On 16 September 1993, he scored a hat-trick in his UEFA Champions League debut in a 5–2 win over Dinamo Minsk in the 1993–94 season.

International career 
After his Bundesliga title with Bremen in 1993, Hobsch was in the scope of the Germany national team's coach Berti Vogts. He won one cap in the summer of that year in an international friendly against Tunisia.

Personal life
His son Patrick is also a professional footballer who currently plays in the 3. Liga for VfB Lübeck.

Honours
Werder Bremen
 Bundesliga: 1992–93
 DFL-Supercup: 1993

References

External links

 
 
 
 Bernd Hobsch at lok-leipzig-db.com 

1968 births
Living people
German footballers
East German footballers
Association football forwards
Germany international footballers
East Germany under-21 international footballers
German expatriate footballers
Expatriate footballers in France
Bundesliga players
2. Bundesliga players
FC Sachsen Leipzig players
1. FC Lokomotive Leipzig players
SV Werder Bremen players
Ligue 1 players
Stade Rennais F.C. players
TSV 1860 Munich players
1. FC Nürnberg players
FC Carl Zeiss Jena players
Footballers from Saxony-Anhalt
German expatriate sportspeople in France
People from Saalekreis
People from Bezirk Halle